Always Near – A Romantic Collection is the second compilation album from American new-age pianist Kevin Kern and his first since 2002's More Than Words: The Best of Kevin Kern. As with his other albums, it is an album of instrumental songs. Unlike More Than Words, Always Near is not merely a "best-of" album, but a compilation of Kevin Kern songs considered most romantic, hence the title. Also, unlike More Than Words, there are no new songs on this album. It was released on September 16, 2014.

The album takes songs from Kern's eight previous studio albums, not counting More Than Words, Enchanted Piano, or Christmas.

Track listing

Personnel
 Kevin Kern - Piano, Keyboards, Producer
 Terence Yallop - Executive Producer

References

External links
Kevin Kern's official website
Kevin Kern at Real Music
The album at Real Music

2014 compilation albums
Kevin Kern albums